John Fricker is a British actor best known for portraying the role of Marteetee in Your Highness and for playing numerous roles in the internet sketch show CAFLTtv. He also narrated the short film Brenda, which won three awards at the 2011 2 Days Laughter Short Film Competition, including Best Film.

References

External links
 

British male film actors
Year of birth missing (living people)
Living people